Computer Dreams is a 1988 film created by Digital Vision Entertainment and released by MPI Home Video.  Written, produced and directed by Geoffrey de Valois and hosted by Amanda Pays, it consists primarily of clips and behind-the-scenes work of early computer graphics animation.  Notably included are Luxo Jr. and Red's Dream, the first two short films from Pixar.  The film is an hour long and features an electronic score by Music Fantastic. It was revised and re-released on DVD as The History of Computer Animation, Volume 2. It won the Winner Gold Special Jury Award at the 1989 Houston International Film Festival, and the 1989 Golden Decade Award from the US Film & Video Festival.

Music used includes:
Gail Lennon - Desire,
Gail Lennon - Like A Dream,
Shandi Sinnamon - Making It,

References
 

1988 direct-to-video films
American animated documentary films
Computer graphics
Documentary films about animation
1988 documentary films
1988 films
Documentary films about computing
1980s American films